Roger José de Noronha Silva, or simply Roger is a Brazilian football goalkeeper.

He signed a contract run until December 2008 in September 2007.

Career

Roger began his career at Flamengo in 1991 when he was a reserve Gilmar.

Was loaned to Victoria in 1994 but then returned to the Gavia, later that year to become the Flamengo goalkeeper.

In 1997, Roger left Flamengo and went to São Paulo, however, failed to win a starting place, left by Zetti.

Followed loaned to Victoria again, and then to Portugal, before returning to the Morumbi in 2001.

It was followed four years in the reserve Rogerio Ceni, until being traded to the Saints in late 2005. However, despite the exchange club, continued to be reserves, this time by Fabio Costa.

Then near the end of 2007, Roger saw his last chance to hold back when the interest arose from Botafogo. Unfortunately, a shoulder injury eventually disrupting their plans, so he decided to retire in mid-2008.

In 2008, Roger was elected alderman, getting 599 votes in his hometown, Canterbury, by Democrats.

External links

Brazilian FA Database  

1972 births
Living people
Brazilian footballers
Brazil under-20 international footballers
Sportspeople from Rio de Janeiro (state)
CR Flamengo footballers
São Paulo FC players
Botafogo de Futebol e Regatas players
Santos FC players
Association football goalkeepers
People from Cantagalo, Rio de Janeiro